Sujata or Sujatha may refer to:

People
Sujata (name), a Hindu/Sanskrit Indian feminine given name includes list of name-holders

Persons known by the single name
Sujatha (actress) (1952-2011), Indian actress
Sujata (actress) ( 1963–1980), Bangladeshi film actress
 Sujata of Sujata and seven types of wives, in the Buddha's teaching
 Sujata (milkmaid), who is said to have fed milk and rice to Gautama Buddha
 Sujata, a name of the Hindu goddess Lakshmi
 Sujā, or Sujātā, is queen of the Heaven of the Thirty-Three in Theravada Buddhism

Persons with the given name
 Alisha Chinai (born Sujatha Chinai; 1965), Indian singer
 Sujatha Mohan (born 1963), South Indian playback singer, known professionally as Sujatha
 Sujatha (writer) (1935–2008), Tamil author

Persons with the surname
C. S. Sujatha (born 1965), Indian politician

Films/series 
 Sujatha (1953 film), directed by T. Sundaram, D. V. Chari.
 Sujata (1959 film), directed by Bimal Roy.
 Sujatha (1980 film), directed by Mohan.
 Sujata (TV series), a 2008 Indian TV series.

Other uses
 Sujatha Vidyalaya, girls' secondary school in Sri Lanka. pagal 
 Sujata Sadan, theatre auditorium in Kolkata, West Bengal
 INS Sujata (P56), Sukanya class patrol vessel of the Indian Navy

See also
 Šuja, Slovakia